Dhangar is a village in Khurai tehsil of Madhya Pradesh.  The village has population of 1499 of which 775 are males and 724 are females as per 2011 Population Census.

References

Villages in Sagar district
Khurai